Surendran Chandramohan (born 3 November 1988) is a Singaporean cricketer. He came to Singapore from India in 2010. He played in Singapore's opening match of the 2017 ICC World Cricket League Division Three tournament, against Malaysia.

In October 2018, he was named in Singapore's squad in the Eastern sub-region group for the 2018–19 ICC World Twenty20 Asia Qualifier tournament. He was the leading run-scorer during the tournament, with 148 runs in six matches.

In July 2019, he was named in Singapore's Twenty20 International (T20I) squad for the Regional Finals of the 2018–19 ICC T20 World Cup Asia Qualifier tournament. He made his T20I debut for Singapore against Qatar on 22 July 2019. He made his List A debut for Singapore, against Qatar, in the 2019 Malaysia Cricket World Cup Challenge League A tournament on 17 September 2019. In October 2019, he was named in Singapore's squad for the 2019 ICC T20 World Cup Qualifier tournament in the United Arab Emirates. Ahead of the tournament, the International Cricket Council (ICC) named him as the key player in Singapore's squad.

References

External links
 

1988 births
Living people
Singaporean cricketers
Singapore Twenty20 International cricketers
Singaporean people of Tamil descent
Singaporean sportspeople of Indian descent